Maicon Marques Bitencourt (born 18 February 1990), simply known as Maicon, is a Brazilian footballer who plays as a winger.

Club career

Fluminense
Born in Duque de Caxias, Rio de Janeiro, Maicon joined Fluminense's youth setup in 2001, aged 11. Promoted to the main squad on 11 March 2008 by manager Renato Portaluppi, he made his debut fifteen days later by coming on as a substitute for Darío Conca in a 4–1 Campeonato Carioca home routing of Mesquita.

Maicon made his Série A debut on 18 May 2008, replacing Léo Itaperuna in a 2–0 home loss against Náutico. He scored his first professional goal the following 31 January, netting his team's second in a 3–0 home defeat of Resende; his first top tier goal occurred on 7 August, as he scored the last in a 5–1 home thrashing of Sport.

In 2009, Fluminense sold 50% of Maicon's rights along with other players in different ratio to Traffic Group.

Lokomotiv Moscow

On 10 March 2010, Maicon joined FC Lokomotiv Moscow in a four-and-a-half-year contract. He made his debut abroad ten days later, replacing goalscorer Dmitri Sychev in a 3–0 home win against PFC Krylia Sovetov Samara.

Maicon scored his first goal abroad on 15 May 2010, netting the last in a 2–0 home win against FC Amkar Perm. A regular starter in the following campaigns, he scored a brace in a 4–0 home routing of FC Anzhi Makhachkala on 5 November 2016.

Antalyaspor
On 16 June 2017, after seven years in Russia, Maicon moved to Turkey after agreeing to a contract with Antalyaspor, effective as of 1 July. On 9 January 2019, Antalyaspor announced that Maicon's contract was terminated by mutual consent.

Atlético Mineiro
On 14 January 2019, Maicon returned to Brazil and joined Atlético Mineiro on a free transfer. He left the club in February 2020.

International career
Maicon represented Brazil at under-17 and under-20 levels, playing an essential role in the latter's victory against Germany for the quarter-finals of the 2009 FIFA U-20 World Cup in Egypt by scoring a brace in a 2–1 victory, which allowed Brazil to proceed to the semifinals.

Career statistics

Honours
Lokomotiv Moscow
 Russian Cup: 2014–15, 2016–17

Brazil
 FIFA U-20 World Cup runner-up: 2009

Buriram United
 Thai League 1: 2021–22
 Thai FA Cup: 2021–22
 Thai League Cup: 2021–22

References

External links

1990 births
Living people
People from Duque de Caxias, Rio de Janeiro
Brazilian footballers
Association football forwards
Campeonato Brasileiro Série A players
Fluminense FC players
Russian Premier League players
FC Lokomotiv Moscow players
Süper Lig players
Antalyaspor footballers
Clube Atlético Mineiro players
Buriram United F.C. players
Footballers at the 2007 Pan American Games
Brazil youth international footballers
Brazil under-20 international footballers
Brazilian expatriate footballers
Brazilian expatriates in Russia
Brazilian expatriate sportspeople in Turkey
Expatriate footballers in Russia
Expatriate footballers in Turkey
Pan American Games competitors for Brazil
Sportspeople from Rio de Janeiro (state)